Ireton may refer to:

Places 
 Ireton, Alberta, a locality in Leduc County
Ireton, England, a hamlet near Idridgehay in Derbyshire
Ireton, Iowa
Ireton, Nova Scotia
Kirk Ireton, an English village

Other uses 
 Ireton (surname)
 Ireton Formation, a sub-unit of the Woodbend Group stratigraphical unit